Ali Ali oglu Hasanov (born 1 January 1976, Baku) is an Azerbaijani artist, musician and filmmaker, participant of a number of art projects in Azerbaijan and abroad.

Ali Hasanov was born in 1976 in Baku, Azerbaijan. He graduated from the Azerbaijani State University of Culture and the Arts and received an MFA in Filmmaking from Rustam Ibragimbekov's Baku International Film School. He is the pioneer performance artist in Azerbaijan and represented Azerbaijan at the 52nd Venice Biennale and at the 4th Moscow Biennale of Contemporary Art. He is also the founder and leader of a musical collective called "PG Large Used Project." Ali Hasanov remains active in various genres such as visual and performance art, video and sound installations. Ali lives and works in Baku.

Most notable projects and exhibitions 
 2011 – Video Installation "Takeaway/Prisoner" at "Beliye Nochi", Museum of Contemporary Art PERMM, Perm, Russia.
 2010 – Short Film "Sonnet XXX" at "Azerbaijani Cinematographers Union", Baku, Azerbaijan.
 2010 – Short Film "Stems from the Drift" at "Azerbaijani Cinematographers Union", Baku, Azerbaijan.
 2009 – Video Installations "Think of the Radio", "Appointment" at DEPO, Istanbul, Turkey.
 2009 – Personal Exhibition "Cathedral Spy" at Protvor Gallery, St.Petersburg, Russia.
 2009 – Mars Gallery (Marsovo pole project), performance-installation "Sentencia", Moscow, Russia
 2007 – International Art-forum "Art Caucasus". Tbilisi, Georgia; "Air Mail" – video.
 2007 – 52nd Venice Biennale "OMNIA MEA", Italy.
 2006 – Art residence (Rogaland Art Centre, Art Centre Tou Scene). "Keelcoushe" performance – installation, Stavanger, Norway
 2006 – "Art Caucasus" – National centre or contemporary art, Moscow, Russia.
 2006 – International art festival "East-o-West" «Keelcoushe" performance-installation, Die, France
 2005 – "Memory Unit" – performance – installation. Museum Centre, Baku, Azerbaijan
 2005 – "Blood with Milk" performance. French Cultural Centre, Baku, Azerbaijan
 2002 – Music art festival "Gender + Theatre" «PG large used project". Musical project "Fridarumental 8000-th probe", Baku, Azerbaijan
 1999 – Art Manege "Sex 2000", Moscow, Russia
 1999 – Performance action "Air paws". Baku Art Centre, Baku, Azerbaijan
 1998 – Performance/social intervention "The brain of galapagos turtle", Baku, Azerbaijan.

External links 
 PG Large Used Project
 Video documentation of Ali Hasanov's performance
 Ali Hasanov at the 52 Venice Biennale
 Ali Hasanov at the Mars Gallery in Moscow
 Ali Hasanov at the "Beliye Nochi" Festival in Perm

Azerbaijani artists
Azerbaijani musicians
1976 births
Living people